Route 208 is a provincial highway located in the Estrie region of Quebec, which links Ayer's Cliff to Martinville via Hatley and Compton. In each of these latter cities it briefly overlaps with Route 143 and Route 147 respectively.

Municipalities along Route 208

 Ayer's Cliff
 Hatley
 Compton
 Martinville

Major intersections

See also
 List of Quebec provincial highways

References

External links 
 Official Transport Quebec Road Map
 Route 208 on Google Maps

208